Since 2009, the Latin Grammy Awards have been held annually in Las Vegas. The Latin Grammy Awards have also been held in four other US cities and will be held outside of the United States for the first time in 2023 when the 24th Annual Latin Grammy Awards are held in Spain.

Host cities and venues
The table below lists the host city, venue, date and hosts for each telecast.

 - Ceremony was originally set to take place on September 11 at the Shrine Auditorium in Los Angeles 

m but were canceled due to the terrorist attacks earlier that day; winners were announced at a later press conference at the Conga Room the following month.
 - Awards in the Brazilian Field were presented at Auditório Ibirapuera in São Paulo, Brazil.

Most Frequent Venues
The Michelob Ultra Arena has hosted seven telecasts, hosting more telecasts than any other venue. The nearly MGM Grand Garden Arena has hosted six telecasts.

Most frequent host cities
Las Vegas has hosted the Latin Grammy Awards fourteen times. Los Angeles has served as host five times, hosting during the infancy of the Latin Grammy Awards. In 2023, the Latin Grammy Awards will be held in Seville, Spain, marking the first time the awards are held outside of the US.

See also
List of Grammy Award ceremony locations

References

.
Grammy Award